The Sibiel is a right tributary of the river Săliște in Romania. It discharges into the Săliște near Fântânele.

References

Rivers of Romania
Rivers of Sibiu County